Fahim Ajani or Raju Shrestha, initially credited as Master Raju or Master Rajoo, is an Indian film and television actor, who started his film career as a child actor, in the 1970s.

Raju has acted in films like Gulzar's Parichay, Hrishikesh Mukherjee's Bawarchi (1972), Yash Chopra's Daag: A Poem of Love (1973), Basu Chatterjee's Chitchor (1976) and Gulzar's Kitaab (1977).

Over the years, he has acted in around 200 films and a few television series.

He won the National Film Award for Best Child Artist for his role in Chitchor (1976).

He is currently seen in youth show Ziddi Dil Maane Na where he plays Prem Deshpremi.

Filmography

Film

 Shart (1969)
 Amar Prem (1972)
 Bawarchi (1972)
 Parichay (1972)
 Nafrat (1973)
 Daag: A Poem of Love (1973)
 Abhimaan (1973)
 Deewaar     (1975)
 Khushboo (1975)
 Chitchor (1976)
 Jeevan Jyoti (1976)
 Kitaab (1977)
 Inkaar (1977 film)
 Kasum Khoon Ki (1977)
 Palkon Ki Chhaon Mein (1977)
 Khatta Meetha (1978)
 Tumhari Kasam (1978)
 Ankhiyon Ke Jharokhon Se (1978)
 Chakravyuha (1978 film)
 Badalte Rishtey (1978)
 Nalayak (1978)
Aatish (1979)
Dhan Daulat (1980)
 Krodhi (1981)
 Hamari Bahu Alka (1982)
Khud-Daar (1982)
 Nastik (1983 film)
 Woh Saat Din (1983)
Charanon Ki Saugandh (1988)
 Baaghi (1990)
 Afsana Pyar Ka (1991)
Saathi (1991 film)
Paayal (1992)
Balwaan (1992)
Anari (1993 film)
Phool (1993 film)
 Shatranj (1993) as Dinky's friend
 Rang(1993) as Jojo (Yogi & Kajal's college friend)
 Khuddar (1994)
Aag (1994 film)
 Saajan Chale Sasural (1996) as Shyam's friend
 Dil Tera Diwana (1996 film)
 Diljale (1996)
 Brij Kau Birju (2000)
 Maseeha (2002)
 Inth Ka Jawab Patthar (2002)
 Pati Ho To Aisa (2004)
 Ek Aur Prem Kahani (2004)
 Jaago (2004)
 Black Friday (2004)
 Khamoshh... Khauff Ki Raat  (2005)

Television

Dubbing career
Raju has dubbed for Suraj Sharma's role as the 16-year-old "Pi" in the Hindi dubbed version of the film, Life of Pi.

Dubbing roles

Live action films

References

External links
http://www.rediff.com/movies/slide-show/slide-show-1-going-back-in-time-with-master-raju/20140724.htm
 

Living people
Male actors in Hindi cinema
Indian male child actors
Indian male voice actors
Indian male television actors
20th-century Indian male actors
Best Child Artist National Film Award winners
Year of birth missing (living people)